Bothwell Road Park is a large public park in Hamilton, South Lanarkshire, Scotland, which dates from 1894.

It is also known as Hamilton Public Park.

The Hamilton Cenotaph is located within the park, as well as a traditional bandstand, erected in 1912, which is a category C listed building. There are also areas of ancient woodland and a children's play area. Until recently the park included a small play pond and a sandpit, although, sadly, these were demolished by South Lanarkshire Council. The National Cycle Route 74 passes the front of the park, following Bothwell Road.

References

External links
 Canmore record, Hamilton Public Park, RCAHMS

Parks in South Lanarkshire
Hamilton, South Lanarkshire
Bandstands in Scotland
Urban public parks in the United Kingdom